Stražišče is a dispersed settlement in the hills northeast of Prevalje in the Carinthia region in northern Slovenia.

History
Stražišče was a hamlet of Prevalje until 1999, when it became a separate settlement.

Notable people
Notable people that were born or lived in Stražišče include:
Janez Gradišnik (1917–2009), author and translator
Tone Jeromel (born 1938), agricultural expert and technical writer
Matija Kresnik (1821–1890), folk poet and self-educated writer
Ludvik Viternik (1888–1973), poet and composer

References

External links
Stražišče on Geopedia

Populated places in the Municipality of Prevalje
Populated places established in 1999
1999 establishments in Slovenia